Riad Nouri, also known as Ryad Nouri, (born 7 June 1985) is a French professional footballer who plays as a midfielder for  club Ajaccio.

Career 
On 27 June 2015, Ajaccio announced the signing of Nouri. On 14 August 2015, he scored his first goal for the club in a 1–1 draw against Evian.

On 7 September 2020, Nouri returned to Ajaccio.

Personal life 
Born in France, Nouri is of Algerian descent.

References

External links
 LFP Profile
 

Living people
1985 births
French sportspeople of Algerian descent
Footballers from Marseille
French footballers
Association football midfielders
Ligue 1 players
Ligue 2 players
Championnat National players
Championnat National 2 players
Championnat National 3 players
TFF First League players
Marignane Gignac Côte Bleue FC players
SO Cassis Carnoux players
FC Istres players
Le Havre AC players
Nîmes Olympique players
AC Ajaccio players
Ümraniyespor footballers
French expatriate footballers
French expatriate sportspeople in Turkey
Expatriate footballers in Turkey